Jeff Reichman is an American politician serving as a member of the Iowa Senate from the 50th district. Elected in November 2020, he assumed office on January 11, 2021.

Early life and education 
Reichman was born in Keokuk, Iowa. After graduating from Keokuk High School, Reichman earned an associate degree from Southeastern Community College and a Bachelor of Business Administration from Iowa Wesleyan University.

Career 
Reichman served in the United States Marine Corps, retiring with the rank of lieutenant colonel. During his career, he served two tours in Iraq. After retiring from the military, he founded Tri-State Home Inspection. Reichman was elected to the Iowa Senate in November 2020 and assumed office on January 11, 2021. Reichman serves as vice chair of the Senate Veterans Affairs Committee and is a member of the Iowa Innovation Council.

References 

Living people
People from Keokuk, Iowa
Southeastern Community College (Iowa) alumni
Iowa Wesleyan University alumni
Republican Party Iowa state senators
Year of birth missing (living people)